Deerfield is an unincorporated community in Ward Township, Randolph County, in the U.S. state of Indiana.

History
Deerfield was platted in 1833. An old variant name of the community was called Mississinewa.

Geography

References

Unincorporated communities in Randolph County, Indiana
Unincorporated communities in Indiana